Bruno dos Santos Nazário (born 9 February 1995), known as Bruno Nazário, is a Brazilian footballer who plays as an attacking midfielder for Chapecoense.

Club career
Born in Cascavel, Paraná, Nazário joined Figueirense's youth setup in 2010, after starting it out at hometown club FC Cascavel. He made his first team – and Série A – debut on 3 November 2012, coming on as a late substitute for Raphael Botti in a 0–1 away loss against Flamengo.

Nazário appeared in four matches during the year, as his side suffered relegation as dead last. He scored his first goal as a senior on 24 March 2013, netting the last in a 4–1 Campeonato Catarinense home routing of Metropolitano.

In May 2013 Nazário left Figueira, after having his federative rights negotiated to a group of investors. He subsequently joined Série B side América Mineiro, on loan from his parent club Tombense.

In August 2013 Nazário signed a four-year deal with German Bundesliga side 1899 Hoffenheim, for a rumoured fee of around €1 million. He made his debut in the category on 3 May 2014, replacing Tobias Strobl in a 2–3 away loss against Borussia Dortmund.

On 28 August 2014, after being rarely used, Nazário was loaned to Polish Ekstraklasa club Lechia Gdańsk for a year.

On 4 January 2016, he was loaned to Cruzeiro Esporte Clube.

Honours
Guarani
Campeonato Paulista Série A2: 2018

Athletico Paranaense
Copa Sudamericana: 2018
J.League Cup / Copa Sudamericana Championship: 2019

References

External links

Profile at kicker.de
Profile at achtzehn99.de

1995 births
Living people
Brazilian footballers
Association football midfielders
Campeonato Brasileiro Série A players
Campeonato Brasileiro Série B players
Figueirense FC players
Tombense Futebol Clube players
América Futebol Clube (MG) players
Cruzeiro Esporte Clube players
Guarani FC players
Club Athletico Paranaense players
CR Vasco da Gama players
Bundesliga players
TSG 1899 Hoffenheim players
Ekstraklasa players
Lechia Gdańsk players
Brazilian expatriate footballers
Brazilian expatriate sportspeople in Germany
Brazilian expatriate sportspeople in Poland
Expatriate footballers in Germany